
Gmina Gąsawa is a rural gmina (administrative district) in Żnin County, Kuyavian-Pomeranian Voivodeship, in north-central Poland.

Villages
Gmina Gąsawa contains the villages and settlements of Annowo, Bełki, Biskupin, Chomiąża Szlachecka, Drewno, Gąsawa, Głowy, Godawy, Gogółkowo, Komratowo, Laski Małe, Laski Wielkie, Łysinin, Marcinkowo Dolne, Marcinkowo Górne, Nowa Wieś Pałucka, Obudno, Oćwieka, Ostrówce, Piastowo, Pniewy, Rozalinowo, Ryszewko and Szelejewo.

Neighbouring gminas
Gmina Gąsawa is bordered by the gminas of Dąbrowa, Mogilno, Rogowo and Żnin.

References
Polish official population figures 2006

Gasawa
Żnin County